The canton of Argonne Suippe et Vesle is an administrative division of the Marne department, northeastern France. It was created at the French canton reorganisation which came into effect in March 2015. Its seat is in Sainte-Menehould.

It consists of the following communes:
 
Argers
Auve
Belval-en-Argonne
Berzieux
Binarville
Braux-Sainte-Cohière
Braux-Saint-Remy
Bussy-le-Château
Cernay-en-Dormois
La Chapelle-Felcourt
Les Charmontois
Le Châtelier
Châtrices
Chaudefontaine
Le Chemin
La Cheppe
Contault
Courtémont
Courtisols
La Croix-en-Champagne
Cuperly
Dampierre-le-Château
Dommartin-Dampierre
Dommartin-sous-Hans
Dommartin-Varimont
Éclaires
Élise-Daucourt
Épense
Florent-en-Argonne
Fontaine-en-Dormois
Givry-en-Argonne
Gizaucourt
Gratreuil
Hans
Herpont
Jonchery-sur-Suippe
Laval-sur-Tourbe
Maffrécourt
Malmy
Massiges
Minaucourt-le-Mesnil-lès-Hurlus
Moiremont
La Neuville-aux-Bois
La Neuville-au-Pont
Noirlieu
Passavant-en-Argonne
Poix
Rapsécourt
Remicourt
Rouvroy-Ripont
Sainte-Marie-à-Py
Sainte-Menehould
Saint-Hilaire-le-Grand
Saint-Jean-sur-Tourbe
Saint-Mard-sur-Auve
Saint-Mard-sur-le-Mont
Saint-Remy-sur-Bussy
Saint-Thomas-en-Argonne
Servon-Melzicourt
Sivry-Ante
Somme-Bionne
Sommepy-Tahure
Somme-Suippe
Somme-Tourbe
Somme-Vesle
Somme-Yèvre
Souain-Perthes-lès-Hurlus
Suippes
Tilloy-et-Bellay
Valmy
Verrières
Le Vieil-Dampierre
Vienne-la-Ville
Vienne-le-Château
Ville-sur-Tourbe
Villers-en-Argonne
Virginy
Voilemont
Wargemoulin-Hurlus

References

Cantons of Marne (department)